Areacandona is a genus of ostracods belonging to the family Candonidae.

Taxonomy

The following species are recognised in the genus Areacandona:
 

Areacandona akatallele 
Areacandona ake 
Areacandona arteria 
Areacandona astrepte 
Areacandona atomus 
Areacandona bluffi 
Areacandona brookanthana 
Areacandona cellulosa 
Areacandona clementia 
Areacandona cognata 
Areacandona cylindrata 
Areacandona dec 
Areacandona fortescueiensis 
Areacandona incogitata 
Areacandona iuno 
Areacandona jessicae 
Areacandona korallion 
Areacandona krypte 
Areacandona lepte 
Areacandona mulgae 
Areacandona namuldi 
Areacandona newmani 
Areacandona novitas 
Areacandona qusilepte 
Areacandona scanloni 
Areacandona stefani 
Areacandona triangulum 
Areacandona undulata 
Areacandona weelumurrae 
Areacandona yuleae

References

Ostracods